One Planet One People is the debut studio album by the American punk rock band The Lookouts. It was released in 1987 through Lookout! Records and was the first ever release on the label. One Planet One People is the first recording featuring Tré Cool of Green Day. Lyrical topics in their songs are religion and the establishment, with some silly, funny songs.

Track listing

Personnel
 Larry Livermore - lead vocals, guitar
 Kain Kong - bass, backing vocals, lead vocals on "Catatonic Society"
 Tré Cool - drums, lead vocals on "The Mushroom Is Exploding"

Production
 Kevin Army - producer, engineer
 The Lookouts - producers
 Davy Normal - front cover art
 Larry Livermore - back cover art
 John Golden - mastering

References

1987 albums
The Lookouts albums
Lookout! Records albums